Glan-yr-afon is a small village near Corwen in Gwynedd, Wales and is situated on the A494. The village is on the boundary of Gwynedd and Denbighshire.

Local businesses include a garage, cafe, the Llawrbetws Caravan Park and a glassblowers, the Glassblobbery Studio and Gallery.

It also has a church and a chapel.

Near Glan-yr-afon is the Braich Ddu wind farm operated by REG WindPower.

Villages in Gwynedd
Llandderfel